Jonathan Brian Weiner (born July 29, 1972), known professionally as Stugotz, is an American sports talk radio host based in Miami, Florida. He is best known for his work on The Dan Le Batard Show with Stugotz on ESPN Radio, where he is the co-host to Miami sports journalist Dan Le Batard.

Early life
Weiner grew up on Long Island in Port Washington, New York. He cites listening to Mike and the Mad Dog as a child as his inspiration for pursuing a career in sports talk radio.

Weiner graduated from Clark University in 1995 with a bachelor's degree in English and communications. He played lacrosse while in college. In Clark's first season as a member of the Pilgrim League in 1992, Weiner was named to the league's All-Star Team after finishing second in league scoring with an average 5.8 points per game. Weiner broke Clark school records for season points (58) and season goals (39). He also tied the school record for goals in a game with nine. He is still number seven in all-time goals scored in a career and number ten in career assists. The team finished 8–34 during his career, including a winless season his senior year.

Broadcasting career
After working as an intern for Madison Square Garden with the New York Knicks and New York Rangers, Weiner moved to south Florida and accepted a similar internship with the Miami Marlins and Miami Dolphins. Weiner was part of a group that started WAXY (AM), better known as 790 The Ticket in South Miami, Florida.

Stugotz and Dan Le Batard were named #6 in Talkers.com 2015 list of the 100 most important sports talk show hosts in America. The duo was also ranked #4 on Barrett Sports Media's list of America's top 20 national sports radio shows of 2015. Furthermore, the podcast for The Dan Le Batard Show with Stugotz is the highest performer for sports media conglomerate ESPN. In 2016, the Miami New Times named Stugotz the "Best AM Radio Personality". Given the growing fandom for Stugotz on the radio show, ESPN has featured him occasionally on flagship television programs such as First Take and Highly Questionable. In 2017, The Dan Le Batard Show with Stugotz was moved to ESPN2's daily lineup from 12 p.m. to 1 p.m. ET (since discontinued). Stugotz had a weekly appearance on ESPN's premier program, SportsCenter, at 8:45 a.m. ET every Wednesday as well as a weekly appearance on Golic and Wingo every Tuesday until that show's cancellation. Stugotz is a fan of the New York Jets.

In 2014, The Le Batard Show posted six billboards in Akron that mocked LeBron James for not thanking the fans of the Miami Heat and rejoining the Cleveland Cavaliers. The billboards were funded entirely by Dan Le Batard even though Stugotz promised for a week to contribute. Stugotz's name appeared on the billboards because of these promises.

Personal life
Weiner resides in Parkland, Florida, with his wife Abby and their two daughters. He is the coach of his daughters' lacrosse team, which is part of the Parkland Redhawks Lacrosse League. Additionally, he is co-head coach of the Madskillz Lacrosse Epic Team.

References

ESPN Radio
American sports radio personalities
Clark University alumni
People from Port Washington, New York
People from Parkland, Florida
Living people
1972 births
College men's lacrosse players in the United States
Lacrosse players from New York (state)